Sarasin Bridge is a bridge in Thailand, it is a bridge connecting the mainland of Phuket and Phang Nga in southern Thailand, and known as one of the most beautiful bridges and has an unforgettable history of Thailand.

It was built in 1951 and officially opened on  July 7, 1967. Its name after Pote Sarasin, a former Prime Minister of Thailand, while he was Minister of National Development.

This bridge on  February 22, 1973 caused an unforgettable tragedy. When two young Phuket lovers are Dam Saetan and Kanchana "Gew" Sae-ngo, they jump in the water from unrequited love. Dam was a local songthaew (local bus) driver and rubber tapping worker. He came from a poor family and struggled to make ends meet. Gew was a teachers college student who used to ride on Dam’s bus. Gew came from a wealthy family and was expected to marry someone who was also rich. As the two got to know each other, they began to fall in love. They sought Gew’s father’s blessing to get married, but he refused their plea and forbade them from seeing each other ever again. Having their love stifled by Gew’s father, the couple decided that if they couldn’t be together, they would take their own lives. On the night of February 22, 1973, they bound themselves together with a loincloth and jumped from the Sarasin Bridge.

The story of the two lovers is forever imprinted in Phuket’s collective memory. In the year 1987 has also been made into a Thai film titled "Saphan Rak Sarasin" (สะพานรักสารสิน; Sarasin, The Bridge of Love, starred by Chintara Sukapatana and Ron Banjongsang).  Sarasin Bridge has since become a tourist attraction and well-known in Phuket and Phang Nga.

At present, Sarasin Bridge does not provide services for cars to run through as in the past. Since the construction of a new bridge adjacent named "Thepkasattri Bridge" (สะพานเทพกษัตรี, or popularly known as New Sarasin Bridge or Sarasin II Bridge) since 2011, Sarasin Bridge becomes the only pedestrian bridge and there are installed light poles and pavilions for sightseeing.

References

External links

Bridges completed in 1967
Bridges in Thailand
1967 establishments in Thailand
Tourist attractions in Phuket province
Tourist attractions in Phang Nga province